Twelfth Fleet or 12th fleet may refer to:

 United States Twelfth Fleet
 12th Air Fleet (Imperial Japanese Navy)

See also

 
 
 
 
 Twelfth (disambiguation)
 Fleet (disambiguation)
 Eleventh Fleet (disambiguation)